The following lists events that happened during 1969 in Laos.

Incumbents
Monarch: Savang Vatthana 
Prime Minister: Souvanna Phouma

Events

January
7 January - Operation Pigfat ends.

March
7 March-17 April - Operation Raindance

June
18 June - Campaign Toan Thang is launched.

July
1-15 July - Operation Off Balance

References

 
1960s in Laos
Years of the 20th century in Laos
Laos
Laos